"Slave of Satan" is a single by Finnish doom metal band Reverend Bizarre. It was released in April 2005. The sole track, "Slave of Satan" appears here unabridged (featuring an intro and outro with a "Recitation of the Black Liturgy" by Daniel Nyman of Oak) as it was later released in edited form (13:26) on the band's second LP. The single was edited to the exact length of 20:59 to fit the total length limitations set for the Finnish single charts. The release hit the Finnish single charts at number 2, staying on the charts for five weeks.

Track listing

References

Reverend Bizarre songs
2005 singles
2005 songs
Spinefarm Records singles